GC Rieber is a private company that operates within the fields of real estate, shipping, food processing and industry. The company is based in Bergen, Norway. Operations are performed by the subsidiaries GC Rieber Shipping AS, GC Rieber Skinn AS, GC Rieber Salt AS, GC Rieber Oils, GC Rieber Compact AS and GC Rieber Eiendom AS.

The company's CEO, Paul-Christian Rieber, is a former president of the main representative body for Norwegian employers, the Confederation of Norwegian Enterprise.

The company was founded in 1879 by Gottlieb Christian Rieber. Gottlieb's brother, Fritz Carl Rieber, ran another company at the time, Rieber & Søn, which their father, Paul Gottlieb Rieber, had founded in 1839. On 13 January 2003, GC Rieber owned 0.75% of Rieber & Søn’s shares.

References

External links

Manufacturing companies of Norway